N-acylethanolamine-hydrolyzing acid amidase is an enzyme that in humans is encoded by the NAAA gene.

Function
This gene encodes an N-acylethanolamine-hydrolyzing enzyme which is highly similar to acid ceramidase. Multiple transcript variants encoding different isoforms have been found for this gene.

References

External links

Further reading